Mahal Kita, Final Answer is a 2002 Philippine romantic comedy film directed by Ike Jarlego Jr. The film stars Bong Revilla and Rufa Mae Quinto.

The film is streaming online on YouTube.

Cast
 Bong Revilla as Benito
 Rufa Mae Quinto as Joanna
 John Lapus as Jimboy
 Patricia Javier as Gwen
 Bobby Andrews as Kenneth
 Anne Curtis as Nanette
 Berting Labra as Jose
 Janice Jurado as Anabel
 Eddie Arenas as Joanna's Stepfather
 Marita Zobel as Benito's Mother
 Jeanette Diaz as Wenn
 Chubi del Rosario as Jojo
 Mandy Ochoa as Benito's Friend
 Edwin Reyes as Benito's Friend
 James Sicangco as Benito's Friend
 Mon Confiado as Sarhento
 Shanah Caratiquet as Joanna's Sister
 O.J. Jacinto as Joanna's Sister

Christopher De Leon cameos as host of Who Wants to Be a Millionaire?.

References

External links

Full Movie on Viva Films

2002 films
2002 romantic comedy films
Filipino-language films
Philippine comedy films
Viva Films films
Films directed by Ike Jarlego Jr.